Jean Brihault was a professor at the University of Rennes 2 which he holds as position of President  from 1996 to 2001. Alongside his teaching activities, he held executive positions in the world of Handball. He was the President of European Handball Federation and the vice-president of International Handball Federation from 2012 to 2016.

Biography

Education
In 1969 he obtained a degree in English language and general license. In 1970 he obtained an English mastery on research topic "The New Irish Question" and the theoretical CAPES. He obtained the aggregation in 1971. He obtained a doctorate in the research subject "Lady Morgan and Ireland" in the year 1985. His Research Director is Professor Jean Noel.

Career as a Teacher
 1971-1972: Associate trainee at Rennes Lycée Anne de Bretagne and University of Rennes 2.
 1972-1974: Associate Professor at the Lycée Baimbridge to Pointe-à-Pitre in the framework of the Technical Support.
 1974-1981: Assistant Professor of English at the University of Rennes 2.
 1981-1982: Assistant Professor of English at the University of Rennes 1.
 1982-1985: Assistant Professor of English at the University of Rennes 2.
 1985-1989: Professor of English Conference
 1989-1992: Second-class Professor of literature and Irish Civilization
 1992: Professor of Literature and Irish Civilization.

Elective Function
On March 15, 1996 he was elected as president of the University of Rennes 2, a position he occupied until March 1, 2001.

Handball Carrier
Parallel to his teaching activities, he plays Handball at the Cercle Paul Bert in Rennes at the position of center back, before arbitrating a thousand matches then become leader within the French Handball Federation. In 2006 he was elected Vice-President of the European Handball Federation by appearing alongside Norwegian Tor Lian, and participates in the organization of many European Handball Championships, the 2010 European Men's Handball Championship. He became president of the European Handball Federation on 22 June 2012.

Awards
Jean Brihault was awarded the title of Knight of the Legion of Honor in February 2004.

External links

1947 births
Living people
Academic staff of Rennes 2 University